The Lamborghini LM002 aka "Rambo Lambo" is an off-road vehicle manufactured by Lamborghini between 1986 and 1993. The LM002 was an unusual departure for Lamborghini which, at the time, was primarily known for high-performance, hand-built, super/sports cars. The LM002 was not the first of its kind to be built by Lamborghini.  Two prototype vehicles, the Cheetah and the LM001, paved the way for LM002. Both vehicles used rear-mounted American power plants and were intended for military use, but were not well received. With the idea of using a front mounted Countach V12 to power the LM001 came the next model, the "LM002", which was the first of the three to see actual production by Lamborghini. The LM002 is part of a series of vehicles, the Lamborghini Militaria.

History

Lamborghini built its first military vehicle, a prototype vehicle codenamed "Cheetah", in 1977.  Lamborghini had designed the vehicle with hopes of selling it to companies in the oil exploration and production industry. The original Cheetah prototype had a rear-mounted Chrysler V8 engine. The only finished prototype was never tested by the U.S. military, only demonstrated to them by its designer, Rodney Pharis. It was later sold to Teledyne Continental Motors by MTI and is apparently still in the U.S. This led Lamborghini to develop the LM001, which was very similar to the Cheetah, but had an AMC V8 engine.

It was finally determined that the engine being mounted in the rear caused too many unfavourable handling characteristics in an offroad vehicle, and the LMA002 was built with an entirely new chassis, moving the engine (now the V12 out of the Lamborghini Countach) to the front. After much testing and altering of the prototype, it was finally given a serial number and became the first LM002. The production model was unveiled at the Brussels Auto Show in 1986. It was dubbed the "Rambo-Lambo".  Civilian models were outfitted with a full luxury package, including full leather trim, tinted power windows, air conditioning, and a premium stereo mounted in a roof console. In order to meet the vehicle's tire needs, Lamborghini commissioned Pirelli to create the Pirelli Scorpion tires with custom, run-flat tread designs. These were made specifically for the LM and were offered in two different tread designs, one for mixed use and the other for sand use only. These tires could be run virtually flat without risk and could handle the desert heat, the loading, and the speeds of the LM. The LM002 was fitted with a  fuel tank.

For those requiring even more power, the Lamborghini L804 type 7.2 litre marine V12, more commonly found in class 1 offshore powerboats, could be ordered.

Near the end of the LM002's production, Turin-based autoshop owner Salvatore Diomante created a one-off "estate" version for the Sultan of Brunei by enclosing the back area and raising the roof. This added significantly to the interior room.

An LM002 was featured in the films No Holds Barred (1989), Toys (1992) and Fast & Furious (2009), as well as the 1990 video game Stunts.

Motorsport
LM002 Evoluzione (alias: LM002 Paris Dakar, 1988)

Two special LM002 cars were built with the intention of making them capable of participating in the Paris Dakar Rally; one is painted white and the other is painted orange. The white one was built in 1988. Funding ran out before it could officially be entered in competition, although one of them did participate in the Rallye des Pharaons in Egypt and another in Greece, both times driven by Sandro Munari. The orange car was developed by Swiss based World LM Racing Team.

See also
 Lamborghini Urus, the successor vehicle to the LM002

References

External links
 Internet Movie Car Database 1986 - Lamborghini LM-002 in "No Holds Barred"

Lamborghini vehicles
Military light utility vehicles
Off-road vehicles
Sport utility vehicles
Cars introduced in 1986
1990s cars
Cars discontinued in 1993